Melmerby is a village and civil parish in the Richmondshire district of North Yorkshire, England. Its neighbours are the villages of Carlton and Agglethorpe. The population of the civil parish was estimated at 40 in 2015.

Melmerby was mentioned in the Domesday Book.  The name is Old Norse, meaning "Melmor's farmstead":  the personal name Melmor is a Scandinavian borrowing from the Old Irish personal name Máel Muire.  Melmerby was historically a township in the large ancient parish of Coverham in the North Riding of Yorkshire, and became a separate civil parish in 1866.  In 1974 it was transferred to the new county of North Yorkshire.

References

External links

Villages in North Yorkshire
Civil parishes in North Yorkshire
Coverdale (dale)